Parayan Thullal is a dance and poetic performance form prevailed in the state  of Kerala, India. This one of the three major thullal forms prevailing in Kerala. Others are Ottan Thullal and Sheethankan Thullal. Usually, it is conducted in the morning time.  The Sanskrit metre Mallika is commonly used in this art form.

Performing

The tempo of this art form is very slow. The performer explains the meanings of the songs by using gestures. The dance element is very little in this art form and most of the time the performer will stand erect. Usually the stories of Parayan thullal deals with spiritual matters.

Costume 
The costume of Parayan thullal resembles Shesha.  The person performing the art wears the dress and crown in the shape of snake. A red cloth is worn on the waist. The face will be adorned with yellow paint.

List of some Parayan Thullals
Sabhapravesham
Thripuradahanam
Kumbhakarnavadham
Dakshayagam
Keechakavadham
Pulindeemoksham
Sundopasundopakhyanam
Nalayanicharitham
Harichandracharitham

See also 

 Ottan Thullal
 Sheethankan Thullal
 Arts of Kerala
 Killikkurussimangalam
 Mani Madhava Chakyar
 Chakyar koothu
 Kathakali
 Mohiniyattam
 Koodiyattam
 Panchavadyam
 Kerala Kalamandalam

References 

Dances of Kerala